Xavier "Xavi" Torres Buigues (born 21 November 1986) is a Spanish professional footballer who plays as a defensive midfielder for CD Lugo.

Formed at Barcelona, he went on to amass La Liga totals of 156 games and six goals over eight seasons, with that club, Málaga, Levante, Getafe, Betis and Sporting de Gijón.

Club career

Early years
Born in Xàbia, Alicante, Valencian Community, Torres spent his entire youth career at Villarreal CF. He made his professional debut at another club in the region, Alicante CF, in the 2006–07 edition of Segunda División B.

Barcelona
Torres signed for FC Barcelona in July 2007 (after Villarreal had rebought him from Alicante), spending the vast majority of his two-year spell with the reserve team, which he helped to return to the third division in his debut campaign as the Catalans were coached by young Pep Guardiola.

Torres made his La Liga debut on 17 May 2009, appearing for the already crowned champions in a 2–1 away loss against RCD Mallorca. After the match, the player said that he was very grateful to Guardiola – promoted to first-team manager the previous summer – for giving him an opportunity to play in the main squad; it would be the first of two appearances.

Málaga
On 12 June 2009, Málaga CF signed Torres on a free transfer for four seasons. He scored his first goal with the Andalusians on 30 August, closing a 3–0 home victory over Atlético Madrid in the 89th minute, in the season's opener.

Torres made his Málaga debut as a starter on 13 September 2009, in a 1–0 defeat at Deportivo de La Coruña, being replaced by Victor Obinna in the 84th minute. However, he appeared rarely in his first year and, on 7 June 2010, was loaned to recently promoted side Levante UD. His first competitive match for the latter took place on 28 August, when he played the entire 1–4 home loss against Sevilla FC.

Levante
In early December 2010, Torres was linked with a potential move to Everton, but nothing came of it. He rarely missed a game for Levante – being the second-most used player in the squad – as the Valencian team finally retained their top-division status. In July 2011, the move was extended for a further season.

Torres scored his first goal for the Granotas on 20 November 2011, in a 3–2 away loss to Atlético Madrid. He ended the campaign with five, as they finished sixth and qualified for the UEFA Europa League for the first time ever.

Getafe
On 31 May 2012, Levante activated the €300.000 buying option it had on Torres, offering the player a four-year contract which he refused. On 1 August, after lengthy negotiations, he signed a four-year deal with fellow top-flight Getafe CF for a fee of approximately €500,000.

Torres started in most of his league appearances for the Madrid outskirts club (37 official matches during the season), his first being on 26 August 2012 in the 2–1 home victory over Real Madrid where he featured 90 minutes.

Betis
On 7 August 2013, Torres signed for four seasons with Real Betis. He scored his first competitive goal 22 days later, the last in a 6–0 home rout of FK Baumit Jablonec in the Europa League playoff round. In December, however, he suffered an Achilles tendon injury in a game against HNK Rijeka in the same competition and was sidelined for the rest of the campaign, which ended with relegation to the second tier.

Later career
Torres terminated his contract with Betis on 15 August 2016, and joined Sporting de Gijón on a one-year deal shortly after. One year and ten days later, after suffering relegation, the 30-year-old moved abroad for the first time in his career, on a one-year contract at Australian club Perth Glory FC.

On 31 July 2018, Torres returned to Spain and its second division after agreeing to a contract with Elche CF. In August 2019, he went back overseas to sign for Al-Arabi SC of the Kuwaiti Premier League, under his former Levante manager Juan Ignacio Martínez.

On 14 September 2020, free agent Torres moved to second-tier CD Lugo on a one-year deal.

Career statistics

Honours
Barcelona
La Liga: 2008–09

Betis
Segunda División: 2014–15

Al-Arabi
Kuwait Emir Cup: 2019–20

References

External links

LaLiga profile

1986 births
Living people
People from Xàbia
Sportspeople from the Province of Alicante
Spanish footballers
Footballers from the Valencian Community
Association football midfielders
La Liga players
Segunda División players
Segunda División B players
Tercera División players
Villarreal CF B players
Alicante CF footballers
FC Barcelona Atlètic players
FC Barcelona players
Málaga CF players
Levante UD footballers
Getafe CF footballers
Real Betis players
Sporting de Gijón players
Elche CF players
CD Lugo players
A-League Men players
Perth Glory FC players
Kuwait Premier League players
Al-Arabi SC (Kuwait) players
Spanish expatriate footballers
Expatriate soccer players in Australia
Expatriate footballers in Kuwait
Spanish expatriate sportspeople in Australia
Spanish expatriate sportspeople in Kuwait